Whalers Gate is a suburb of New Plymouth, in the western North Island of New Zealand. It is located to the southwest of the city centre. 

The area was allocated to several whalers in 1847, and was called "The Whaler's Gate" at least from 1860. The main street, Barrett Road, is named after Dicky Barrett, one of the whalers.

Demographics

Whalers Gate had a population of 2,274 at the 2018 New Zealand census, an increase of 405 people (21.7%) since the 2013 census, and an increase of 954 people (72.3%) since the 2006 census. There were 939 households, comprising 1,077 males and 1,197 females, giving a sex ratio of 0.9 males per female. The median age was 51.8 years (compared with 37.4 years nationally), with 345 people (15.2%) aged under 15 years, 258 (11.3%) aged 15 to 29, 930 (40.9%) aged 30 to 64, and 741 (32.6%) aged 65 or older.

Ethnicities were 88.5% European/Pākehā, 8.0% Māori, 0.9% Pacific peoples, 8.0% Asian, and 2.1% other ethnicities. People may identify with more than one ethnicity.

The percentage of people born overseas was 19.8, compared with 27.1% nationally.

Although some people chose not to answer the census's question about religious affiliation, 39.1% had no religion, 50.5% were Christian, 0.1% had Māori religious beliefs, 0.9% were Hindu, 0.3% were Muslim, 0.5% were Buddhist and 1.2% had other religions.

Of those at least 15 years old, 363 (18.8%) people had a bachelor's or higher degree, and 420 (21.8%) people had no formal qualifications. The median income was $29,900, compared with $31,800 nationally. 348 people (18.0%) earned over $70,000 compared to 17.2% nationally. The employment status of those at least 15 was that 774 (40.1%) people were employed full-time, 267 (13.8%) were part-time, and 42 (2.2%) were unemployed.

Notes

Suburbs of New Plymouth